The Unknown Guest (German: Der unbekannte Gast) is a 1931 German comedy film directed by E.W. Emo and starring S.Z. Sakall, Lucie Englisch and Kurt Vespermann. It was shot at the Halensee Studios in Berlin. The film's sets were designed by the art director Ernö Metzner. It was given an American release in 1935.

Synopsis
When her master and mistress are away, a chambermaid pretends to be the owner of the house where her father visits as he is unaware of her status as a servant.

Cast
 S.Z. Sakall as Leopold Kuhlmann
 Lucie Englisch as Lucie, his daughter
 Kurt Vespermann as Harry Müller
 Annie Markart as Olly, his wife 
 Hilde Hildebrand as 	Ita Hanna
 Senta Söneland as 	Frau Steinmann
 Hans Brausewetter as Fritz Müller, chauffeur
 Oskar Sima as Jean Diener

References

Bibliography 
 Klaus, Ulrich J. Deutsche Tonfilme: Jahrgang 1931. Klaus-Archiv, 2006. (Possibly?  )
 Waldman, Harry. Nazi Films in America, 1933–1942. McFarland, 2008. (Possibly? )

External links 
 

1931 films
Films of the Weimar Republic
German comedy films
1931 comedy films
1930s German-language films
Films directed by E. W. Emo
German black-and-white films
Films shot at Halensee Studios
1930s German films